Golf in the 25th Southeast Asian Games was held at SEA Games Golf Course in Vientiane, Laos from 11–14 December.

Medal summary

Men

Women

Medal table

Legend

References

External links
 
 SEA Games Federation Office (Results Book)  

2009 Southeast Asian Games events
2009
Southeast Asian Games